FK Akademija Pandev, commonly known as Akademija Pandev, is a football club based in Strumica, North Macedonia which competes in the Macedonian First League.

History
The academy was founded in 2010 by the Macedonian football player Goran Pandev, after whom the Academy was named. As of 2014, Akademija Pandev has a senior team competing in the Macedonian senior leagues. In 2017, the senior team was promoted to the Macedonian First League for the first time in its history.

In February 2018, the team moved to play their home games at Stadion Kukuš due to a disagreement over rent with FK Belasica.
In the 2018–19 season they won the Macedonian Football Cup winning beating Makedonija G.P on penalties after a 2–2 draw. Akademija won 4–2 on Penalties 6–4 in aggregate.

Home ground
Mladost Stadium is a multi-purpose stadium in Strumica, North Macedonia. It is currently used mostly for football matches and the stadium's capacity is 6,500 spectators. With the last reconstruction in 2017 the stadium has a capacity of 9,200 seats, and it is a third-class field in accordance with UEFA standards. It meets the conditions for a high-ranking competition and is the second such stadium in the country.

Honours

 Macedonian First League:
Runners-up (1): 2021–22 

 Macedonian Second League:
Winners (1): 2016–17

 Macedonian Football Cup:
Winners (1): 2018–19
Runners-up: 2020–21

Recent seasons

1The 2019–20 season was abandoned due to the COVID-19 pandemic in North Macedonia.

European record

As of 14 July 2022

Notes
 QR: Qualifying round

Current squad

References

External links
Academy info at MacedonianFootball 
Football Federation of Macedonia 
 

Football academies in Europe
2010 establishments in the Republic of Macedonia
Sport in Strumica